Bolesław Dembiński (9 May 1833, Posen (today Poznań) – 7 August 1914) was a Polish composer and organist, and an activist for the singer's societies.

References
Witold Jakóbczyk, Przetrwać na Wartą 1815-1914, Dzieje narodu i państwa polskiego, vol. III-55, Krajowa Agencja Wydawnicza, Warszawa 1989

1833 births
1914 deaths
Musicians from Poznań
Polish classical composers
Polish male classical composers
People from the Grand Duchy of Posen